The Protocols for Native American Archival Materials (PNAAM) is a set of best professional practices around the care and use of American Indian archival materials that are held in non-tribal libraries, archives, museums, and other cultural institutions.

PNAAM was originally developed by the First Archivist Circle in 2006 to promote conversation, collaboration, and cultural sensitivity. They were highly influenced by Australia's Aboriginal and Torres Strait Islander Protocols for Libraries, Archives, and Information Services. PNAAM complements the Native American Graves Protection and Repatriation Act of 1990, which does not cover the repatriation of archival materials that are not human remains or funerary items.

Archivists and other activists presented the document to the Society of American Archivists (SAA) in 2008 and again in 2012, but SAA declined to endorse the document both times. Critics' comments included culturally insensitive and white supremacist language and promoted the traditional Western view of archives, that all researchers should be provided with unrestricted access to archival materials.

Prior to national endorsement, several institutions adopted the protocols independently, such as the American Philosophical Society and Northern Arizona University's Cline Library, where PNAAM was originally drafted. In 2018, the SAA Council endorsed PNAAM. It was endorsed by the Association of College and Research Libraries in 2020.

References

Native American culture
Archival science
2006 establishments in the United States
Native American librarianship